Tamaz Meliava (23 December 1929 – 27 August 1972) was a Soviet Georgian film director and screenwriter. He directed six films between 1958 and 1973.

Filmography
 Mtvaris motatseba (meore seria) (1973)
 Mtvaris motatseba (pirveli seria) (1972)
 Londre (1966)
 Tetri karavani (1963)
 Prostaya veshch (1958)
 U tikhoi pristani (1958)

External links

1929 births
1972 deaths
Burials at Didube Pantheon
Soviet film directors
Soviet screenwriters
Male screenwriters
Screenwriters from Georgia (country)
Film directors from Georgia (country)
20th-century screenwriters